Max Marshall may refer to:
 Max Marshall (baseball)
 Max Marshall (singer)